The Isle of Wight Festival is a British music festival which takes place annually in Newport on the Isle of Wight, England. It was originally a counterculture event held from 1968 to 1970.

The 1970 event was by far the largest of these early festivals and the unexpectedly high attendance levels led, in 1971, to Parliament adding a section to the Isle of Wight County Council Act 1971 preventing overnight open-air gatherings of more than 5,000 people on the island without a special licence from the council. The event was revived in 2002.

Original festival
The original events were promoted and organised by the Foulk brothers (Ron and Ray Foulk) under the banner of their company Fiery Creations Limited and their younger brother Bill Foulk. The venues were Ford Farm (near Godshill), Wootton and Afton Down (near Freshwater) respectively. The 1969 event featured Bob Dylan and the Band. This was Dylan's first paid performance since his motor cycle accident some three years earlier, and was held at a time when many still wondered if he would ever perform again. Followers from across the world trekked to the Isle of Wight for the performance. Estimates of 150,000–250,000 attended. The 1969 festival opened on Friday 29 August—eleven days after the close of Woodstock. Dylan was living in Woodstock, New York, at the time and it was widely believed that he would perform there, after the event had been "put in his own backyard". As it happened, Dylan left for the Isle of Wight on 15 August—the day the Woodstock festival began.

The 1970 event was by far the largest of these early festivals; indeed it was said at the time to be one of the largest human gatherings in the world, with estimates of over 600,000, surpassing the attendance at Woodstock. Included in the line-up of over fifty performers were Jimi Hendrix, Miles Davis, The Doors, The Who, Lighthouse, Ten Years After, Emerson, Lake & Palmer, Joni Mitchell, The Moody Blues, Melanie, Donovan, Gilberto Gil, Free, Chicago, Richie Havens, John Sebastian, Leonard Cohen, Jethro Tull, Taste (Irish band) and Tiny Tim. The unexpectedly high attendance levels led, in 1971, to Parliament adding a section to the Isle of Wight County Council Act 1971 preventing overnight open-air gatherings of more than 5,000 people on the island without a special licence from the council.

The 1970 festival was filmed by a film crew under director Murray Lerner, who at that point had just directed the Academy Award-nominated documentary Festival of the Newport Folk Festival.  The footage passed to Lerner in settlement of legal fees after a dispute with the Foulk brothers in which each side claimed against the other for breach of contract.  Lerner distilled material from the festival into the film Message to Love (released on video in the US as Message to Love: The Isle of Wight Festival: The Movie) released theatrically in 1996 and subsequently on DVD. In addition to this film, Lerner has created full-length films focused on performances by individual artists at the 1970 festival. To date there have been individual films of Miles Davis, Jimi Hendrix, The Who, Emerson, Lake & Palmer, The Moody Blues,  Free, Taste (Irish band), Leonard Cohen, Jethro Tull, The Doors and Joni Mitchell.
Dave Roe (ex Liverpool Collegiate) produced all the psychedelic  artwork for posters and advertising material.

1968
The first festival was held at Hells Field, Ford farm, near Godshill, on 31 August and 1 September 1968, and was attended by about 10,000 people. Jefferson Airplane headlined, with Arthur Brown, The Move, Smile, Tyrannosaurus Rex, Aynsley Dunbar Retaliation, Plastic Penny, Fairport Convention, and The Pretty Things also performing.

1969

This took place on 30 and 31 August 1969 at Wootton, with an estimated attendance of 150,000. The line-up included Bob Dylan, The Band, The Nice, The Pretty Things, Marsha Hunt, The Who, Third Ear Band, Bonzo Dog Doo-Dah Band, Fat Mattress, Joe Cocker. Many celebrities of the day also attended the Festival, including John Lennon and Yoko Ono, George Harrison with Pattie Boyd, Ringo Starr with Maureen Starkey, Keith Richards and Jane Fonda.

1970

This event was held between 26 and 30 August 1970 at Afton Down. Attendance has been estimated by the Guinness Book of Records to have been 600,000 or even 700,000. However promoter Ray Foulk has said he believes it to have been half of that. It was widely reported on, due to its line-up and extremely high attendance. Acts included Jimi Hendrix, Miles Davis, Jethro Tull, Ten Years After, Chicago, The Doors, Lighthouse, The Who (whose set produced a live album), Emerson, Lake & Palmer, Supertramp, The Moody Blues, Joan Baez, Free, Joni Mitchell, Leonard Cohen, Kris Kristofferson, Donovan, Ralph McTell, John Sebastian, Terry Reid, Taste (Irish band), and Shawn Phillips.

Revived festival details
The event was revived in 2002 at Seaclose Park, a recreation ground on the outskirts of Newport. It has been held annually since that year, progressively extending itself northwards beyond Seaclose Park along the fields of the eastern Medina valley. Many artists have performed since its revival including The Rolling Stones, Amy Winehouse, Paolo Nutini, The Crazy World of Arthur Brown, Paul McCartney, Muse, Boy George, Stereophonics, Faithless, Donovan, Ray Davies, Robert Plant, Queen + Adam Lambert, David Bowie,  Manic Street Preachers, The Who,  The High Kings, R.E.M., Travis, Coldplay, The Zombies, The Proclaimers, Bryan Adams, The Police, Foo Fighters, The Killers, Nile Rodgers and Chic, Fleetwood Mac, Madness, Paloma Faith and Kings of Leon. Bowie's 13 June 2004 concert would prove to be his last live performance in the UK following emergency angioplasty in Hamburg after a concert in Germany twelve days later which eventually saw him retire from touring. It was sponsored by Nokia from 2004 to 2006. The promoters of the event now are Solo Promoters Ltd.

There was no festival in 2020.

2002

Held 3 June 2002
Attendance: 8,000 (approx)
Headline acts (Saturday): The Charlatans, Robert Plant

2003

Held 14–15 June 2003
Attendance: 15,000 (approx)
Headline acts:
 Saturday: Paul Weller, Starsailor
 Sunday: Bryan Adams, Counting Crows

2004

Held 11–13 June 2004
Attendance: 35,000 (approx)
Headline acts:
 Friday: Stereophonics, Groove Armada
 Saturday: The Who, Manic Street Preachers
 Sunday: David Bowie, The Charlatans

2005

Held 10–12 June 2005
Attendance: 50,000 (approx)
Headline acts:
 Friday: Faithless, Razorlight
 Saturday: Travis, Roxy Music
 Sunday: R.E.M., Snow Patrol

2006

Held 9–11 June 2006
Attendance: 50,000 (approx)
 Headline acts:
 Friday – The Prodigy, Placebo
 Saturday: Foo Fighters, Primal Scream
 Sunday: Coldplay, Richard Ashcroft

2007

Held 8–10 June 2007
Attendance: 60,000 (approx)
 Headline acts:
 Friday: Snow Patrol, Groove Armada
 Saturday: Muse, Kasabian
 Sunday: The Rolling Stones, Keane

2008

Held 13–15 June 2008
Attendance: 55,000 (approx)
 Headline acts:
 Thursday: (Big Top) Björn Again, Suspiciously Elvis 
 Friday: Kaiser Chiefs, N.E.R.D
 Saturday: Sex Pistols, Ian Brown
 Sunday: The Police, The Kooks

2009

Held 12–14 June 2009
Attendance: 50,000 (approx)
 Headline acts:
 Thursday: (Big Top) The Human League, King Meets Queen 
 Friday: The Prodigy, Basement Jaxx
 Saturday: Stereophonics, Razorlight
 Sunday: Neil Young, Pixies

2010

Held 11–13 June 2010
Attendance: 60,000 (approx)
 Headline acts:
 Thursday: (Big Top) Squeeze, Are You Experienced
 Friday: Jay-Z, Florence and the Machine
 Saturday: The Strokes, Blondie
 Sunday: Paul McCartney, P!nk

2011

Held 10–12 June 2011
Attendance: 65,000 (approx)
 Headline acts:
 Thursday: (Big Top) Boy George, ABC
 Friday: Kings of Leon, Kaiser Chiefs
 Saturday: Foo Fighters, Pulp
 Sunday: Kasabian, Beady Eye

2012

Held 22–24 June 2012
Attendance: 55,000 (approx)
 Headline acts:
 Thursday: (Big Top) Primal Scream, The Stranglers
 Friday: Tom Petty & The Heartbreakers, Elbow
 Saturday: Pearl Jam, Biffy Clyro
 Sunday: Bruce Springsteen and The E Street Band, Noel Gallagher's High Flying Birds

2013

Held 14–16 June 2013
 Attendance: 58,000 (approx)
Headline acts:
  Thursday: (Big Top) Happy Mondays, The Farm 
 Friday: The Stone Roses, Paul Weller
 Saturday: The Killers, Bloc Party
 Sunday: Bon Jovi, The Script

2014
Held 12–15 June 2014
 Attendance: 58,000+ (approx)
 Headline acts:	
 Thursday: (Big Top) Boy George, Inspiral Carpets 
 Friday: Calvin Harris, Biffy Clyro
 Saturday: Red Hot Chili Peppers, The Specials
 Sunday: Kings of Leon, Suede

2015 
Held 11–14 June 2015
Attendance: 58,000+ (approx)
 Headline acts:
 Thursday: (Big Top) Billy Idol, UB40
 Friday: The Prodigy, The Black Keys
 Saturday: Blur, Pharrell Williams
 Sunday: Fleetwood Mac, Paolo Nutini

2016 
Held 9–12 June 2016
Attendance: 58,000+ (approx)
 Headline acts:
 Thursday: (Big Top) Status Quo, Cast
 Friday: Faithless, Stereophonics
 Saturday: The Who, Richard Ashcroft
 Sunday: Queen + Adam Lambert, Ocean Colour Scene

2017 
Held 8–11 June 2017
Attendance: 45,000+
 Headline acts:
 Thursday: (Big Top) Razorlight, Starsailor
 Friday: David Guetta, Run-D.M.C.
 Saturday: Arcade Fire, Catfish and the Bottlemen
 Sunday: Rod Stewart, Bastille

2018 
Held 21–24 June 2018
Attendance: 72,000 
 Headline acts:
 Thursday: (Big Top) The Wombats, Hot Dub Time Machine 
 Friday: Kasabian, The Script
 Saturday: Depeche Mode, Liam Gallagher
 Sunday: The Killers, Manic Street Preachers

2019 

Held 13–16 June 2019
Attendance: 59,000
Headline Acts:
Thursday: (Big Top) Wet Wet Wet, Heather Small
 Friday: Noel Gallagher's High Flying Birds, Courteeners
 Saturday: George Ezra, Fatboy Slim
 Sunday: Biffy Clyro, Richard Ashcroft

2020 
The 2020 event, which had been scheduled for 11–15 June, was cancelled due to the COVID-19 pandemic.

 Originally scheduled headline acts:
 Thursday: (Big Top) Happy Mondays
 Friday: Lionel Richie, Lewis Capaldi
 Saturday: Snow Patrol, The Chemical Brothers
 Sunday: Duran Duran, Black Eyed Peas

On 12–14 June 2020, Absolute Radio and Sky Arts both held virtual festivals, broadcasting selected acts from the festival's archives, including exclusive footage from the 1970 edition.

2021 
The 2021 event was originally scheduled to take place on 17–20 June, it was postponed to 16–19 September, the first time that it took place in the autumn.

 Headline acts:
 Thursday: (Big Top) Scouting for Girls, Sophie Ellis Bextor
 Friday: Liam Gallagher, Tom Jones
 Saturday: Snow Patrol, David Guetta
 Sunday: Duran Duran, The Script, 

Sky Arts broadcast sets from the show each night of the festival from 7pm with Becky Hill, Kaiser Chiefs and Razorlight's sets shown alongside the headliners.

2022 
The 2022 event took place on 16–19 June.

 Headline acts:
 Thursday: (Big Top) Happy Mondays, Heather Small
 Friday: Lewis Capaldi, Madness, 
Saturday: Pete Tong, Kasabian, 
 Sunday: Muse, Rudimental

2023 
The 2023 event will take place on 15-18 June. 

 Headline Acts:
Thursday: (Big Top) Groove Armada (DJset) 
Friday: Pulp, Courteeners 
Saturday: The Chemical Brothers, George Ezra 
Sunday: Robbie Williams, Blondie

Awards
 
|-
| rowspan="2" |2007
| rowspan="2" |UK Festival Awards
|Best Major Festival
|
|
| rowspan="2" |
|-
|Outstanding Contribution to UK Festivals
|John Giddings
|
|-
|2009
|ILMC 21 Arthur Awards
|Liggers' Favourite Festival
|
|
|
|-
| rowspan="4" |2015
| rowspan="2" |UK Festival Awards
|Best Family Festival
|
|
| rowspan="2" |
|-
|Headline Performance of the Year
|Fleetwood Mac
|
|-
|Isle of Wight Visitor Attraction Association Awards
|Best Activity/Event
|
|
|
|-
|Festival Baby Awards
|Best Festival
|
|
|
|-
| rowspan="4" |2016
|Family Traveller Awards
|Best Family Festival
|
|
|
|-
|ILMC 28 Arthur Awards
|Liggers' Favourite Festival
|||  
|
|-
|Live Music Business Awards
|Best Festival
|
|
|
|-
|Red Funnel Isle of Wight Awards
|Best Event to Lie Back & Soak Up the Sounds 
|
|
|  
|- 
|rowspan="2" |2017
|ILMC 29 Arthur Awards
|Liggers' Favourite Festival
|||  
|
|-
|Red Funnel Isle of Wight Awards
|Best Event to Lie Back & Soak Up the Sounds 
|
|
|  
|- 
| rowspan="12" |2018
|Red Funnel Isle of Wight Awards
|Best Event to Lie Back & Soak Up the Sounds 
|
|
|  
|-
|Audio Production Awards
|Best New Producer
|Nick Harris
|
|
|-
|Event Production Awards
|Music Event of the Year
|
|
|
|-
|ILMC 30 Arthur Awards
|Liggers' Favourite Festival
|||  
|
|-
|Music Week Awards
|Festival of the Year
|||  
|
|-
| rowspan="3" |Radio Academy Awards
|Best Coverage of an Event
|Absolute Radio||  
| rowspan="3" |
|-
|Best New Presenter
|James Bay||  
|-
|Best Factual Storytelling
|||  
|-
|Q Awards
|Best Festival/Event
|||  
|
|-
| rowspan="3" |UK Festival Awards
|Best Festival Production
|||  
| rowspan="4" |
|-
|Best Major Festival
|||  
|-
|Line-Up of the Year
|||  
|-
| rowspan="5" |2019
|Broadcast Awards
|Best Music Programme
|||  
|
|-
|Event Production Awards
|Music Event of the Year
|||  
|
|-
|Live Music Business Awards
|Best Festival Performance
|Biffy Clyro||  
|
|-
|Music Week Awards
|Festival of the Year
|||  
|
|-
|Q Awards
|Q Best Festival/Event
|||  
|
|-
|2020
|Pollstar Awards
|International Music Festival of the Year
|||  
|
|-

See also
List of historic rock festivals
List of music festivals in the United Kingdom

References

External links

 
 Ray Foulk on The History of the Isle of Wight Festival
Isle of Wight County Press gallery of Festival pictures
Information on the Original IOW Festivals
1970 Isle of Wight Festival Veterans
Isle of Wight Festival Rumours
Memorabilia from the Original Isle of Wight Festivals 1968-69-70

 
Music festivals on the Isle of Wight
Recurring events established in 1968
Annual events in the United Kingdom
2002 establishments in England
Music festivals established in 2002
Music festivals established in 1968
1968 in England
1968 in British music
Counterculture of the 1960s